This is a list of museums in Mozambique.

List 

 Eduardo Mondlane University Museum of Natural History
 Museu da Revolução
 Museu de História Natural (Mozambique)
 Museu Nacional da Moeda (Mozambique)
 Museu Nacional de Arte (Mozambique)
 Museu Nacional de Etnologia (Mozambique)
 Museu Nacional de Geologia (Mozambique)
 Museu Regional de Inhambane
 Museus da Ilha de Moçambique

See also 
 List of museums

External links 
 Museums in Mozambique

Mozambique
Museums
Museums
List
Museums
Mozambique